Adesmia may refer to:
Adesmia (plant), a genus of flowering plants in the legume family
Adesmia (beetle), a genus of darkling beetles